José Manuel Hidalgo y Esnaurrízar (6 April 1826 – 27  December 1896) was a Mexican soldier, diplomat, and writer. He played a key role in the establishment of the Second Mexican Empire

Biography
Hidalgo was born in 1826 to Mercedes Esnaurrizar and Francisco Manuel Hidalgo, an Andalusian colonel that supported Augustin de Iturbide during the movement for Mexican Independence.

One of his first major jobs was working under the Ministry of Finance, and in 1846 was able to serve as secretary to Manuel Eduardo de Gorostiza.

During the Mexican-American War,  he fought under the command of Gorostiza at the Battle of Churubusco and at the Battle of Contreras, was wounded and taken prisoner. 

He was appointed by president Manuel de la Peña y Peña to serve as a diplomat in London and was later sent to Rome. In Europe he made the acquaintance of Silvio Pellico, Giacomo Antonelli, Pope Pius IX, Queen Victoria, Pedro V, Ludwig I, and Isabel II. It was his friendship with Eugénie de Montijo, the Spanish born wife of Napoleon III, that allowed him lobby for French support of establishing a Mexican monarchy, an effort which ultimately culminated in the French Intervention in Mexico, and the establishment Second Mexican Empire. 

After the fall of the Empire he left Mexico for France. To supplement his income during exile he published several novels. His novels were a mixture of realism and sentimentalism dealing with the aristocracy, the nobility, and the grand bourgeoisie. 

He died in Paris in 1896.

See also

Second Mexican Empire
José María Gutiérrez de Estrada

References

Mexican military personnel of the Mexican–American War
Mexican monarchists
Mexican diplomats
1826 births
1896 deaths